Fredholm is a small lunar impact crater that is located in the rugged ground to the west of the Mare Crisium. It was named after Swedish mathematician Erik I. Fredholm. It was previously designated Macrobius D. It lies midway between the prominent craters Macrobius to the north and Proclus almost due south.

This is a circular, symmetrical formation with a bowl-shaped interior. The inner walls gradually slope down towards the small, central floor, which is less than one quarter the total diameter of the crater. Neatly attached to the northern rim is the smaller Macrobius E.

References

External links

 LTO-43C3 Proclus — L&PI topographic map

Impact craters on the Moon